Vexillum arabicum is a species of small sea snail, marine gastropod mollusk in the family Costellariidae, the ribbed miters.

Description

Distribution
This marine species occurs off Dhofar, Oman.

References

 Turner H. (2008) New species of the family Costellariidae from the Indian and Pacific Oceans (Gastropoda: Neogastropoda: Muricoidea). Archiv für Molluskenkunde 137(1): 105–125. [27 June 2008] page(s): 115
 Gori, S.; Rosado, J.; Salisbury, R. A. (2019). Costellariidae (Gastropoda) from Dhofar, Oman with descriptions of eight new species and notes on Vexillum appelii (Jickeli, 1874). Acta Conchyliorum. 18: 25-48.

arabicum
Gastropods described in 2008